Hogstad is a locality situated in Mjölby Municipality, Östergötland County, Sweden with 241 inhabitants in 2010.

References 

Populated places in Östergötland County
Populated places in Mjölby Municipality